Arcicella aquatica  is a bacterium from the genus of Arcicella which has been isolated from the neuston film of a freshwater lake in Russia.

References

External links
Type strain of Arcicella aquatica at BacDive -  the Bacterial Diversity Metadatabase	

Cytophagia
Bacteria described in 2004